Rasmus Kulmala (born June 21, 1994) is a Finnish-born Hungarian professional ice hockey forward. He is currently a free agent having last played for DVTK Jegesmedvék in the Slovak Extraliga.

Kulmala made his SM-liiga debut playing with HC TPS during the 2011–12 SM-liiga season.

References

External links

1994 births
Living people
DVTK Jegesmedvék players
Finnish ice hockey forwards
HC Shakhtyor Soligorsk players
HC TPS players
Orlik Opole players
People from Loimaa
Tappara players
TuTo players
Sportspeople from Southwest Finland